Felix Perera is a Sri Lankan politician, a member of the Parliament of Sri Lanka and a government minister.

References
 

Living people
Members of the 10th Parliament of Sri Lanka
Members of the 11th Parliament of Sri Lanka
Members of the 12th Parliament of Sri Lanka
Members of the 13th Parliament of Sri Lanka
Members of the 14th Parliament of Sri Lanka
Government ministers of Sri Lanka
Sri Lanka Freedom Party politicians
United People's Freedom Alliance politicians
1945 births
Social affairs ministers of Sri Lanka
Fisheries ministers of Sri Lanka